"With All of My Heart" is the first single from ZOEgirl's second studio album, Life. It was written by Joe Priolo and Chrissy Conway-Katina.  It was ZOEgirl's first No. 1 radio hit, and their only song to reach No. 1 on the Christian contemporary hit radio chart.

Background 
The song is based on the Great Commandment.

Composition 
"With All of My Heart" is a pumped-up worship song.

Charts

Peak position

References 

2001 singles
2001 songs
Sparrow Records singles